Jody Grace (born 9 November 1967) is a former Irish hurling player. He played hurling with his local club Toomevara and with the Tipperary senior inter-county team from 1991 to 1995.

He was an unused substitute when Tipperary won the 1991 All Ireland.
He made his championship debut in 1994 against Clare in a 0-13 to 2-11 defeat at the Gaelic Grounds, which was his only Championship start for Tipperary.
He was in goal when Tipperary won the National Hurling League in 1994.

References

External links
Tipperary Archives Profile

Living people
Toomevara hurlers
Tipperary inter-county hurlers
Munster inter-provincial hurlers
1967 births